The 1992 French Athletics Championships took place from 26-28 June 1992 at the Parc des sports et de l'amitié in Narbonne.

Titles

References

External links 
 Les finalistes des championnats de France - 1991 à 1998 at cdm.athle.com
 Results at gbrathletics.com

1992
Athlétisme
France
June 1992 sports events in Europe
Narbonne
Sport in Aude